e2open, LLC is a business-to-business provider of cloud-based, on-demand software for supply chains for computer, telecom and electronics systems, components and services. The company was founded in 2000 as a joint project of 8 major companies: Hitachi, IBM, LG Electronics, Matsushita, Nortel, Seagate, Solectron, and Toshiba.

E2open offers its products across a variety of industries, including high technology, industrial manufacturing, telecommunications, life sciences, oil and gas, consumer electronics, aerospace and defense, and consumer goods.

Company

E2open is headquartered in Austin, Texas, with offices in Parsippany, NJ, Atlanta, Germany, United Kingdom, Denmark, China, France, Malaysia, and India.

According to the company's estimate, more than 60,000 trading partners and 200,000 unique registered users currently participate in the E2open Business Network.

In July 2012, E2open went public on the NASDAQ.

In March 2015, Insight Venture Partners announced that it had completed its acquisition of E2open.

In February 2021, E2open went public via SPAC (special purpose acquisition company) merger and began trading under the ticker ETWO.

Acquisitions by E2open
July 2013: acquired supply chain vendor ICON-SCM.
June 2014: acquisition of SERUS Corporation, a "cloud-based manufacturing and product management provider". 
March 2016: acquisition of Terra Technology. 
June 2016: acquired Orchestro. 
February 2017: acquired Steelwedge. 
Late 2017:  acquired Channel Data Management provider Zyme. 
Early 2018:  acquired Entomo and Birch Worldwide. 
October 2018: bought the shipping platform INTTRA. 
October 2018: bought Cloud Logistics. 
July 2, 2019: E2open completes acquisition of global trade management software company Amber Road.
May 2021: acquired logistics execution platform BluJay Solutions for $1.7B.

See also
 Supply-chain management
 Electronic commerce
 Enterprise application integration

References

Software companies based in California
Supply chain software companies
Service-oriented (business computing)
Software industry
Cloud platforms
Business software companies
Software companies of the United States
2000 establishments in the United States
2000 establishments in California
Software companies established in 2000
Companies established in 2000
2015 mergers and acquisitions
Companies formerly listed on the Nasdaq